Military operations other than war (MOOTW) focus on deterring war, resolving conflict, promoting peace, and supporting civil authorities in response to domestic crises.  The phrase and acronym were coined by the United States military during the 1990s, but it has since fallen out of use. The UK military has crafted an equivalent or alternate term, peace support operations (PSO). Both MOOTW and PSO encompass peacekeeping, peacemaking, peace enforcement and peace building. The People's Liberation Army developed a similar concept based on MOOTW, known as "Non-War Military Activities," which expanded on MOOTW and includes a range of activities characterized as "Confrontational," "Law Enforcement," "Aid & Rescue," or "Cooperative" in nature.

MOOTW not involving the use or threat of force include humanitarian assistance and disaster response. Special agreements exist which facilitate fire support operations within NATO and the ABCA quadripartite working group, which includes American, British, Canadian and Australian military contingents. Cooperation is organized in advance with NATO standardisation agreements (STANAGs) and quadripartite standardisation agreements (QSTAGs). Many countries which need disaster support relief have no bilateral agreements already in place; and action may be required, based on the situation, to establish such agreements.

MOOTW also involves arms control and peacekeeping.

The United Nations (UN) recognises the vulnerability of civilians in armed conflict.  Security Council resolution 1674 (2006) on the protection of civilians in armed conflict enhances international focused attention on the protection of civilians in UN and other peace operations.  The implementation of paragraph 16 anticipates that peacekeeping missions are provided with clear guidelines regarding what missions can and should do to achieve protection goals; that the protection of civilians is given priority in decisions about the use of resources; and that protection mandates are implemented.

Overview
MOOTW purposes may include deterring potential aggressors, protecting national interests and support the United Nations (UN) objectives.

Peacetime and conflict represent two states of the range of military operations.
 Peacetime is a state in which diplomatic, economic, informational, and military powers are employed in combination with each other to achieve national objectives.
 Conflict is a unique environment in which the military works closely with diplomatic leaders to control hostilities; and the national objective is focused on the goal of returning to peacetime conditions.

Planners are challenged to find ways to resolve or work around unique arrays of inter-related constraints, e.g., issues related to budgeting, training and force structure.  The uncertainties which are inherent or implied include the varying political aspects which are likely to affect unanticipated MOOTW.

Australia
The Australian Defence Forces has turned attention to the study and understanding of a changing geo-strategic environment.  MOOTW becomes more important where the options for traditional application of military instruments are growing more limited.

Australian participation in UN peacekeeping operations began in 1947.

Select Australian deployments

 1947 UN Consular Commission to Indonesia
 2005 Nias–Simeulue earthquake ("Operation Sumatra Assist"): Emergency relief and medical assistance.

Current Australian deployments include the UN Assistance Mission in Afghanistan (UNAMA); the UN Assistance Mission for Iraq (UNAMI); the UN Peacekeeping Force in Cyprus (UNFICYP); the UN Truce Supervision Organization (UNTSO); the UN Integrated Mission in Timor-Leste (UNMIT); the UN Mission in the Sudan (UNMIS); and the UN–African Union Mission in Darfur (UNAMID).

Canada
The curriculum of Canada's military training programs includes MOOTW.  Canadian peacekeeping is well publicised in Canada.

Select Canadian deployments

 Cyprus, 1960s
 Congo, 1960s

China

The non-traditional missions of the Chinese armed forces have evolved as an increasingly used tool of statecraft.

The People's Liberation Army (PLA) established specialized forces for military operations other than war. In the 2013 Science of Military Strategy, PLA writers articulated a Non-War Military Activities (NWMA) concept based on MOOTW which emphasizes "Confrontational," "Law Enforcement," "Aid & Rescue," and "Cooperative" military activities as a source of military strength alongside traditional deterrence and warfighting.

Select Chinese deployments

 Somali pirates, 2009: Naval escort missions in waters off Somalia.

Japan

The military in Japan is affected by Japan's pacifist post-war constitution.  This affects classification of the Hyūga class helicopter carriers, which are ships of the Japan Maritime Self-Defense Force (JMSDF).  The missions of these ships are limited to "military operations other than war."

Select Japanese deployments

 Iraq War ("Operation Enduring Freedom"), 2003–2009: Ground Self-Defense Forces, water purification near Basra; Air Self-Defence Forces, cargo and personnel transport; Maritime Self-Defence Forces, supply ships servicing the international flotilla.

United Kingdom

The prescience of Sir Julian Corbett (1854–1922) and his strategic point of view are reflected in contemporary applications of MOOTW, which extend and reinvigorate Corbettian formulations.

The evolution of British tactics in the Malayan Emergency (1948–1960) illustrates lessons learned the hard way.  The British developed a strategy with elements similar to "military operations other than warfare."  Lieutenant General Sir Harold Briggs proposed "two key goals to accomplish in order to end the insurgency—first, to protect the population, and second to isolate them from the guerrillas."

British peacekeeping troops in Bosnia in the late 1990s attended to similar objectives in a process of re-establishing "normalcy."

Selected British deployments

 1948–1960 Malayan Emergency.
 1995 post-Bosnian War ("Operation Deliberate Force").

United States

In United States military doctrine, military operations other than war include the use of military capabilities across a range of operations that fall short of war. Because of political considerations, MOOTW operations normally have more restrictive rules of engagement (ROE) than in war.

Although the MOOTW acronym is new, the concepts are not. The RAND database identifies 846 military operations other than war between 1916 and 1996 in which the US Air Force or its predecessors played a noteworthy role.

Select American deployments

 2005 Nias–Simeulue earthquake: Emergency relief and medical assistance.
 1990–1994 Operation Promote Liberty: Occupation and peacekeeping mission in Panama after the 1989 United States invasion of Panama.
 1991 Operation Eastern Exit: Noncombatant evacuation operation to evacuate diplomatic staff and civilians, from the US and 29 other countries, from the US Embassy in Mogadishu, Somalia as the city plunged into near-anarchy during the Somali Civil War.
 2001–2014 Operation Enduring Freedom: Bush Doctrine continuous operation across numerous countries, mainly Afghanistan, Pakistan, Kyrgyzstan and Uzbekistan.
 2011 military intervention in Libya: UN-authorized no-fly zone enforcement in defense of rebel factions in Libya.

Singapore
The Singapore Armed Forces (SAF) anticipates a continuing need for conventional military competence into the foreseeable future, but missions in which the use of minimal force is the rule rather than the exception are expected to grow in importance. Proficiency in MOOTW requires a much greater and somewhat different set of skill sets than traditional war-fighting.  In this context, the SAF is developing new training programmes for small unit leaders.  The process of educating and preparing a professional SAF capable of handling a wide spectrum of operations anticipates an increase in MOOTW.
 These men will need to ready to become "peacekeepers, goodwill ambassadors and winners of hearts and minds."

In 1999, the Singapore contingent of UN peacekeepers in East Timor was the most extensive MOOTW mission attempted by the SAF. The commitment included three landing ship tanks (LSTs), medical teams, C-130s, military observers and logistics support.

Select Singapore deployments

 United Nations Transitional Administration in East Timor, 1999–2002. Peacekeeping, medical assistance, logistical support.
 2004 Indian Ocean Earthquake and Tsunami, Aceh Province, Sumatra, Indonesia ("Operation Flying Eagle" or OFE): Emergency relief, medical assistance and temporary relocation of victims.

Sweden

Select Swedish deployments

 Swedish Armed Forces conducted supporting operations during the forest fires of 2014 and 2018.
 Operation Gloria, 2020–ongoing. Supporting Swedish civil authorities during the COVID-19 pandemic in Sweden.

India 
The Indian Army is tasked with many operations other than war such as Operation Sadbhavana (Goodwill) in Jammu and Kashmir and Operation Samaritan in north-east India. Operation Sadbhavana aims to limit the alienation faced by the population and infrastructure destruction in Jammu and Kashmir in areas where the government administration has not been successful due to insurgency. Welfare initiatives include Army Goodwill Schools, educational and motivational tours, health camps, women and youth empowerment and infrastructure development.

The Indian defence forces also takes part in various UN Peacekeeping missions.

See also
 Counter-insurgency
 Fourth-generation warfare
 Low intensity conflict
 Grey-zone (international relations)

Notes

References
 Bonn, Keith E. and Anthony E Baker. (2000). Guide to Military Operations Other than War: Tactics, Techniques, and Procedures for Stability and Support operations, Domestic and International. Mechanicsburg, Pennsylvania: Stackpole Books. ; 
 Frantzen, Henning-A. (2005). NATO and peace support operations, 1991–1999: policies and doctrines. London: Routledge. 
 Segal, Hugh. (2005). Geopolitical Integrity. Institute for Research on Public Policy (IRPP). ; 
 "U.S. Joint Doctrine, Joint Force Employment Briefing Modules."
 Vick, Allen, John William Stillion and Abram N. Shulsky. (1997). Preparing the U.S. Air Force for Operations Other than War. Santa Monica, California: RAND. ; 

 
Military terminology